Pedro Pi (14 September 1899 – 3 January 1970) was a sailor from Spain, who represented his country at the 1924 Summer Olympics in Le Havre, France.

References

Sources
 
 

1899 births
1970 deaths
Olympic sailors of Spain
Real Club Marítimo de Barcelona sailors
Sailors at the 1924 Summer Olympics – 6 Metre
Spanish male sailors (sport)